Irigoyen is a surname. Notable people with the surname include:

Adam Irigoyen (born 1997), American actor
Bernardo de Irigoyen (1822–1906), Argentine lawyer, diplomat and politician.......
Bernardo Irigoyen (born 1969), Argentine cricketer
Elsa Irigoyen (1919–2001), Argentine fencer
José Irigoyen (before 1797 – c. 1839), appointed Spanish governor of Texas who never arrived to claim his office
Julio Irigoyen (1894–1967), Argentine film director
María Irigoyen (born 1987), Argentine professional tennis player
Martín Irigoyen (born 1977), Argentine musician, composer and one of the pioneers of the steampunk sound
Matías de Irigoyen (1781–1839), Argentine soldier and politician
Miguel de Irigoyen (1764–1822), Argentine soldier and police chief
Roberto Irigoyen (before 1923 – after 1948), Argentine cinematographer
William Irigoyen (born 1970), French journalist

Fictional characters
Iman (comics) (Diego Irigoyen), fictional superhero from DC Comics

See also
Bernardo de Irigoyen, Misiones, city in the province of Misiones, Argentina
Bernardo de Irigoyen, Santa Fe, town (comuna) in the center-east of the province of Santa Fe, Argentina
Yrigoyen (disambiguation) (also Yrigollen)

Basque-language surnames